Barbodes snyderi (common name: Snyder's barb ) is a species of cyprinid fish endemic to Taiwan. It grows to  length. It is also used as an aquarium fish.

References 

snyderi
Freshwater fish of Taiwan
Endemic fauna of Taiwan
Cyprinid fish of Asia
Taxa named by Masamitsu Ōshima
Fish described in 1919